Letters (stylized as LETTERS) is considered the "major 3.5th" album by Japanese idol group Bish released through Avex Trax on July 22, 2020.

Track listing

Charts

References

2020 albums
BiSH albums